The Chin National Organisation was a political party in Burma.

History
Allied with the Clean AFPFL, the party contested the 1960 general elections, winning a single seat.

References

Defunct political parties in Myanmar
Political parties with year of disestablishment missing
Political parties with year of establishment missing